Sasami: Magical Girls Club, produced by AIC and BeSTACK, is a magical girl anime television series using characters from the Tenchi Muyo! franchise in new roles. The series follows Sasami Iwakura who is recruited to a school club of magical girls. It is officially recognized as a Tenchi Muyo! spin-off. The series comprises two seasons with a total of 26 episodes.  Season 1 aired on WOWOW on Thursday nights from April 13, 2006 to July 13, 2006, and season 2 aired from October 5, 2006 to January 11, 2007. Both seasons were licensed for a release in the United States by Funimation Entertainment. On January 12, 2009, the series made its North American debut on the FUNimation Channel.

Episode list

References

2006 Japanese television seasons
Sasami Magical Girls Club
Tenchi Muyo!